Wroclaw Voivodeship was a unit of administrative division and local government in Poland in years 1975–1998, superseded by Lower Silesian Voivodeship. Its capital city was Wrocław.

Major cities and towns (population in 1995)
 Wrocław (642,700)
 Oleśnica (38,900)
 Oława (31,800)

See also
 Voivodeships of Poland

References

Former voivodeships of Poland (1975–1998)
 States and territories established in 1975